James Simpson Ord (12 July 1912 – 14 January 2001) was an English cricketer who played for Warwickshire from 1933 to 1953. He was born in Backworth, Northumberland and died in Solihull. He appeared in 273 first-class matches as a right-handed batsman who bowled right arm medium pace. He scored 11,788 runs with a highest score of 187 not out among 16 centuries and took two wickets with a best performance of one for 0.

Notes

1912 births
2001 deaths
English cricketers
Warwickshire cricketers
Northumberland cricketers
People from Backworth
Cricketers from Tyne and Wear